Sidney A. Marchand (1887–1972) was an American lawyer, politician and local historian. He served as a member of the Louisiana House of Representatives from 1912 to 1916, and from 1928 to 1932. He was the mayor of Donaldsonville, Louisiana from 1929 to 1933. He was the author of many books about the history of Louisiana.

Early life
Sidney A. Marchand was born on December 5, 1887, on the Riverside Plantation in Ascension Parish, Louisiana. He graduated from the Law School at Louisiana State University in 1910.

Career
Marchand co-founded a law firm in Donaldsonville, Louisiana with partner Gustave Adolphus Gondron in 1910.

Marchand served as a member of the Louisiana House of Representatives from 1912 to 1916, and from 1928 to 1932. He served as the mayor of Donaldsonville from 1929 to 1933.

Marchand was the author of several books about the history of Louisiana.

Personal life and death
Marchand married Mary E. Edwards. They had a son, Sidney A. Marchand, Jr., and two daughters, Jessie Earline (Reynolds) and Mary Elizabeth (Montgomery) (.

Works

References

1887 births
1965 deaths
People from Donaldsonville, Louisiana
Louisiana State University alumni
Louisiana lawyers
Mayors of places in Louisiana
Members of the Louisiana House of Representatives
20th-century American politicians
20th-century American lawyers